

About ACMI 
ACMI was initially known as the Crayon, Water Color & Craft Institute, Inc.  It was renamed the Art & Craft Materials Institute in 1982.  It adopted its current name in the late 2000s.
ACMI was founded in 1936 and is currently headquartered in Hingham, Massachusetts.

The Council for Art Education 
ACMI was the founding member of the Council for Art Education, Inc. (CFAE), which promotes art education across the US. CFAE holds March as Youth Art Month and encourages teachers to involve students in their art month flag program. They continue to be CFAE's largest supporter today.

References

External links
 ACMI
 Youth Art Month

Trade associations based in the United States
Organizations established in 1936
Handicrafts
Companies based in Plymouth County, Massachusetts
Companies based in Massachusetts